Josef Lahner is an Austrian para-alpine skier. His guide is Franz Erharter.

Lahner won a silver medal and two bronze medals at the 2019 World Para Alpine Skiing Championships. Lahner and Erharter competed in all five events but were disqualified in the Super-G and Super combined events as they missed the last gate.

References 

Year of birth missing (living people)
Living people
Paralympic alpine skiers of Austria
Place of birth missing (living people)
21st-century Austrian people